ACI Worldwide Inc. is a payment systems company headquartered in Miami, Florida. ACI develops a broad line of software focused on facilitating real-time electronic payments. These products and services are used globally by banks, financial intermediaries such as third-party electronic payment processors, payment associations, switch interchanges, merchants, corporations, and a wide range of transaction-generating endpoints, including automated teller machines ("ATM"), merchant point of sale ("POS") terminals, bank branches, mobile phones, tablet computers, corporations, and internet commerce sites.

History 

ACI was founded in Omaha, Nebraska as Applied Communications Inc, on 
September 1, 1975, to develop software for communications applications using the new NonStop computers from Tandem Computers. The founders were James Cody, Dave Willadsen, and Dennis Gates. Chuck Hackett, Charly Foglesong, and Mike May began ACI's relationship with Tandem. Early projects involved building systems to handle ATMs and front ends for core banking systems, which led to the launch of the first product, BASE24, in 1982. BASE24 was coined by a salesman to represent "Baseline Software for 24 hour-per-day system operations".

BASE24 was expanded over time to service transactions from other channels, such as POS terminals and bank branch systems. The product portfolio grew to cover functions related to card transactions, such as clearing, settlement and fraud detection. The hardware support for these products was extended to suppliers IBM, HP, Stratus and Sun Microsystems.

In the 1990s, ACI's product range was expanded to cover wholesale banking payments with software for ACH transactions and wire transfers leading to the acquisition of IntraNet, Inc. in 1998, and adding the Money Transfer System product.

Since 1995, ACI has been publicly traded on NASDAQ, initially under the name Transaction Systems Architects (TSA), and, since July 2007, under the name ACI Worldwide, Inc. (ACIW). Prior to that ACI had periods of ownership by US West and Tandem, and as a private company.

Acquisitions 
August 7, 1998: IntraNet, Inc. was acquired by ACI Worldwide predecessor Transaction Systems Architects, Inc. IntraNet, Inc. manufactured software systems to facilitate electronic payments.
January 11, 2001: MessagingDirect was acquired by Transaction System Architects Inc., for approximately 3.3 million shares of Transaction Systems' Class A Common Stock.
June 29, 2005: S2 Systems signed an agreement to sell substantially all of its assets to Transaction Systems Architects, Inc.
October 5, 2005: Restructuring of Transaction Systems Architects, Inc. into a highly focused organization, merging ACI, Insession and IntraNet   into one operating unit under the name ACI Worldwide. The name change became official in July, 2007.
August 8, 2006: P&H Solutions Inc., a provider of a Web-based corporate cash management product, was acquired by ACI Worldwide.
February 7, 2007: Visual WEB Solutions Inc., a financial banking applications company, was acquired.
November 17, 2009: Euronet Essentis was purchased by ACI to expand card issuing and merchant management capabilities
March 21, 2011: Acquisition of ISD Corporation was announced, to broaden the functionality of ACI's payments products for retailers.
February 13, 2012: S1 Corporation was acquired to broaden ACI's suite of payment offerings for financial organizations, processors and retailers.
March 11, 2013: Online Resources Corporation was acquired.
November 5, 2013:The purchase of Official Payments Holdings, a seller of electronic bill payment technology that processed about 20 million payments, worth more than $9 billion, annually, was completed.
July 21, 2014: An agreement was announced to acquire Retail Decisions (ReD). It was completed on August 12, 2014.
November 4, 2015: The acquisition of PAY.ON who provide white-label hosted payment gateway services was completed.
February 28, 2019: ACI enters agreement to acquire Speedpay, Western Union's U.S. bill pay business, for $750 million

References

External links 
 ACI Worldwide website

Payment service providers
Financial technology companies
Financial software companies
Financial services companies of the United States
Financial services companies established in 1975
Software companies established in 1975
American companies established in 1975
Companies listed on the Nasdaq
Software companies based in Florida
Companies based in Miami
1970s establishments in Nebraska
1995 initial public offerings
Software companies of the United States